Yusuf Hossain Humayun is a Bangladesh Awami League politician and the former Member of Parliament of Barisal-4.

Career
Humayun was elected to parliament from Barisal-4 as a Bangladesh Awami League candidate in 1973. He was President of the Bangladesh Supreme Court Bar Association in 2016-17 term.

References

Awami League politicians
Living people
1st Jatiya Sangsad members
Year of birth missing (living people)